is a Japanese footballer who last played for Giravanz Kitakyushu as a striker.

Career 
Komatsu was chosen as one of the Designated Players for Development by J. League and JFA in 2005 when he was a student of Kwansei Gakuin University. Because of this status, he was able to register as a Cerezo Osaka player while he was still eligible to play for his university club. However, he did not play any official match for Cerezo.

After graduating from university in 2006, he officially signed with Cerezo. On 12 August 2006, he made his J. League debut in a 1–0 loss against Omiya Ardija. Two month later, he was loaned out to Kyu-League side V-Varen Nagasaki.

He returned to Cerezo for the 2007 season and his first goal for the club in a 3-1 win against Mito HollyHock, on May 23. During the 2007 season, he managed to form a strike partnership with fellow striker Tatsuya Furuhashi, as the pair scored a total of 30 goals between them.

Due to injuries, after three years with Giravanz Kitakyushu, Rui Komatsu opted to quit football and retired in January 2018 to become a coach at Cerezo Osaka.

Career statistics

Club
Updated to 26 February 2018.

References

External links
Profile at Cerezo Osaka

1983 births
Living people
Kwansei Gakuin University alumni
Association football people from Kōchi Prefecture
Japanese footballers
J1 League players
J2 League players
J3 League players
Cerezo Osaka players
V-Varen Nagasaki players
Kawasaki Frontale players
Oita Trinita players
Giravanz Kitakyushu players
Association football forwards